Concordia University Chicago is a private university in River Forest, Illinois. Formerly a college exclusively for parochial teacher education, Concordia-Chicago now offers more than 100 undergraduate and postgraduate degrees and enrolls more than 5,000 students. The university is a member of the Concordia University System, a nationwide network of colleges and universities affiliated with the Lutheran Church–Missouri Synod (LCMS).

Concordia Chicago, originally named Addison Teachers Seminary, was founded in the Lutheran tradition by Saxon German immigrants in 1864. The university continues to maintain strong ties to its faith-based heritage.

History

Background
Lutheran teacher training in the United States began in Perry County, Missouri; Fort Wayne, Indiana; and Milwaukee, Wisconsin, in 1839, 1846, and 1855 respectively. In 1857, the responsibility for the operation of the teachers seminary in Milwaukee was given to the LCMS. Subsequently, the Milwaukee teachers seminary moved and merged operations with Fort Wayne's uniting it with the theological seminary that had been founded there by followers of Johann Konrad Wilhelm Löhe.

In October 1863, the LCMS in convention voted unanimously to move the teachers seminary to Addison, Illinois, appointed the first Praeses of the institution, and instructed that a new building be constructed on land donated by a local Lutheran congregation.

Founding and Addison campus
Concordia University Chicago marks 1864 as its founding in Addison, Illinois. Originally called Addison Teachers Seminary, the institution is the oldest in the Concordia University System. The West District School Society (today's St. Paul Lutheran Church) sold  to the college for the nominal amount of $10 in November 1863, and construction began on a new facility, with the cornerstone-laying service on June 15, 1864. Zion Lutheran Church donated $3,128 towards construction. The Civil War impeded construction, so a vacant nearby two-story tavern building was rented to ensure the new teachers' seminary could carry out its educational training as scheduled, beginning September 1, 1864. Forty-three men and boys, aged 14-33, were in attendance the first year.

The first building, a three-story structure designed for 60 students, was dedicated on December 28, 1864. Enrollment grew to 110 in 1874 and to 240 in 1885, requiring additional construction. A north wing to the main building opened in 1868, a south wing in 1875, and a separate lecture hall called New Hall in 1885. The Commons Building, containing the dining room, kitchen, and bakery, opened behind the main building in 1886, and the physical education building, called Turnen Hall, opened in 1895. The faculty grew from two in 1864 to nine in 1906, housed in nine faculty residences on the campus.

A large celebration was held when the final Addison class graduated in June 1913. The campus was purchased in 1914 by the Chicago City Mission Society and became the Addison Manual Training School for Boys and the Industrial School for Girls. In 1924, the original buildings were demolished and replaced by a larger facility. When alumni learned of the planned demolition, they retrieved the cornerstone, 75 stone window sills, the stone steps of the north wing, and the stone slab over the entrance of Old Main on the site of the seminary and constructed a monument. The monument was dedicated in 1925 and refurbished in 1982.

River Forest campus
On November 12, 1912, ground was broken for a new campus in River Forest, Illinois. More than 8,000 people attended the cornerstone laying service on December 15, 1912. On October 12, 1913, the institution moved to its present campus with an estimated 30,000–45,000 people attending the dedication. Prior to the dedication of the River Forest campus, much discussion took place regarding a new name for the institution. On May 20, 1913, the faculty settled on Concordia Teachers College with the official charter from the Illinois Secretary of State's office being issued on April 28, 1915.

In 1979, the institution expanded its education-centered program to become a full liberal arts institution and changed its name to Concordia College. Eleven years later, in 1990, having experienced tremendous growth in its graduate offerings, the school reorganized and changed its legal name to Concordia University. Since then the institution has branded itself as Concordia University River Forest (1990–2006) and Concordia University Chicago (2006–present)

Colleges
Concordia University Chicago has four colleges: 
College of Business
College of Education
College of Health, Science & Technology
College of Theology, Arts & Humanities

Many students attend classes online or at Cohort (educational group) sites around the Chicago metropolitan area.

Athletics
Concordia Chicago teams participate as a member of the National Collegiate Athletic Association's Division III. Concordia Chicago was a member of the Northern Illinois-Iowa Conference until the spring of 2006, and since 2006 has been a member of the Northern Athletics Collegiate Conference (NACC). Men's sports include baseball, basketball, cross country, football, lacrosse, soccer, tennis, and track & field; women's sports include basketball, cross country, lacrosse, soccer, softball, tennis, track & field, and volleyball. The school colors are maroon and gold.

Music
The current chair of the music department is Professor Johnathan Kohrs. Dr. Richard Fischer is the Director of Bands, where he conducts the Wind Symphony and University Band as well as teaching conducting and music education classes. The Wind Symphony, Concordia's premiere instrumental ensemble, has performed in 43 states, Europe, Asia, and most recently, South Africa. The group has released fourteen recordings of sacred wind music. The ensemble has given many premiere performances of compositions by current wind band composers. The Wind Symphony performed at Carnegie Hall on March 4, 2014, and again on March 13, 2019.

The Kapelle, under the direction of Dr. Charles Brown, is the university's premiere choral ensemble, and has performed around the U.S. and in Europe and South America. The ensemble also has multiple recordings to its credit. Dr. Steven Wente, previously the chair of the music department, retired as distinguished professor of music in 2020. Wente continues to teach organ as an adjunct professor and serves as the organist for the Chapel of Our Lord. Other musical ensembles include Schola Cantorum (Chapel Choir, conducted by Jonathan Kohrs), Chamber Orchestra (Maurice Boyer), Mannerchor (Men's Chamber Choir with Charles Brown), Laudate (Women's Chamber Choir with Maurice Boyer), Jazz Band (Kirk Garrison), University Handbells (Johnathan Kohrs), Cougar Band (student-led pep band), and other ensembles.

Notable alumni
 Bernard Bull—American academic administrator and scholar
 Adrian Griffin —basketball coach and former college basketball player
 Tony Harper (American football)
 Paul Walter Hauser—actor and comedian
 Richard Hillert—composer and professor of music
 Scot Kerns—Lutheran pastor and member of the Montana state legislature.
 Paul Manz—composer, organist, conductor, and professor of music
 Nick Nurse — basketball coach, author, and former college basketball player
 Jim Platt—basketball coach
 Carl Schalk—composer, professor of music
 Mark Warkentien—basketball coach, recruiter, and executive

References

External links
Official website

 
Educational institutions established in 1864
Universities and colleges affiliated with the Lutheran Church–Missouri Synod
Universities and colleges in Cook County, Illinois
Private universities and colleges in Illinois
1864 establishments in Illinois